The iodate fluorides are chemical compounds which contain both iodate  and fluoride anions (IO3− and F−). In these compounds fluorine is not bound to iodine as it is in fluoroiodates.

List

References 

Iodates
Fluorides
Mixed anion compounds